, also known as Dark Tamatam Thrilling Chase!, is a 1997 Japanese animated film and the fifth installment of the Crayon Shin-chan series.

Plot 
Shinnosuke and his dog Shiro discovers an unconscious man near the lake while walking in the afternoon, where he picks a shiny ball lying next to the man. Shinnosuke returns home and while he is distracted, his sister Himawari swallows the ball. That night, the Nohara family are attacked by the same man accompanied by his brothers. They introduce themselves as Rose, Lavender and Lemon and reveal themselves to be searching for the ball picked by Shinnosuke. After discovering that Himawari swallowed that, they forcefully take the Nohara family with them. On the way, the brothers explain to the Noharas that they are the descendants of the Tamayura tribe. 

One day, the leader of Cataplines tribe awakened the Dark power Jack to gain magical abilities and rule the world with Jack, but was defeated when Tamayura defeated Jack. In order to prevent Jack from reawakening, Tamayura divided Jack's powers into two balls in a statue and hid it deep within. Now the Cataplines' descendants Hexon who achieved mind reading techniques from meditation in Tibet, Tamao Nakamura and her three daughters, trained in Gymnastics and Satake, a martial artist are after the balls (with one already in their possession). The group stops at a hot spring to take some rest as Yone Higashimatsuyama, a cop from Chiba city joins them. However, they are ambushed by the Cataplines and fortunately escape them. Hexon however, uses his mind-reading abilities to locate the group. 

The Cataplines once again track them down as Yone and Hiroshi get separated from the rest of the group. The next morning, the Cataplines once again attack the group at a grocery store and succeed in capturing Lemon and Lavender. Rose leads the Nohara family to his home in the mountains as Yone and Hiroshi rejoin the group. Rose informs his mother about the situation as she orders her soldiers to defend Himawari at all costs. She also reveals Rose, Lemon and Lavender's real names to be Takeshi, Kiyoshi and Tsuyoshi. This time, only Hecson comes from the Cataplines but succeeds in capturing Himawari despite the best efforts of Takeshi, Takeshi's mother, Takeshi's mother's troops, Yone, Shinnosuke, Hiroshi and Misae. Using her own abilities, Takeshi's mother discover the Cataplines to be near Tokyo's industrial regions the next morning. 

Shinnosuke, Shiro, Hiroshi, Misae, Yone and Takeshi head straight away to save Himawari. Meanwhile, Hexon and Tamao extract the ball from Himawari, where they warn Satake not to get attached to Himawari. The group arrives as Satake leaves the Cataplines and joins Takeshi and returns Himawari to the Nohara family. A fight ensues between the group and Tamao's daughters and in midst of the chaos, Tamao and Hexon escape. Tamao and Hexon try to insert the two balls in Jack's statue as Tamao betrays Hexon. The group arrives to retrieve Jack's statue as a fight ensues, where Shinnosuke uses his humor to overcome Hexon's abilities and ultimately succeeds. However, Shinnosuke and Himawari accidentally awakens Jack by inserting the two balls, but Jack reveals that he had died many years ago and is just an ordinary human being and no longer wields dark powers. As Yone arrests the Cataplines, the Nohara family return home.

Cast 
 Akiko Yajima as Shinnosuke Nohara
 Miki Narahashi as Misae Nohara
 Keiji Fujiwara as Hiroshi Nohara
 Satomi Kōrogi as Himawari Nohara
 Daisuke Gōri as Rose
 Kaneto Shiozawa as Lavender
 Shinya Ōtaki as Lemon
 Yuriko Yamamoto as Yone Higashimatsuyama
 Suwon Rin as Tamayura's mother
 Keiko Yamamoto as Tamao Nakamura
 Jun Hazumi as Hexon
 Saeko Shimazu as Chimama Maho
 Fumihiko Tachiki as Satake
 Mari Mashiba as Shiro
 Shin Aomori as Jack
 Yoshito Usui as Cartoonist
 Rokurō Naya as Bunta Takakura (principal)
 Yumi Takada as Midori Yoshinaga
 Michie Tomizawa as Ume Matsuzaka
 Tamao Hayashi as Nene Sakurada
 Teiyū Ichiryūsai as Masao Sato
 Chie Satō as Bo Suzuki

Characters

Hexon 
One of the descendants of the Clan of the Cataplines who had emigrated to Europe. He can read the minds of their opponents by a training in Tibet. He has blonde and blue eyes.

Majo
It is directed by the troops of Clan Cataplines. She is an expert in the art of rhythmic gymnastics combative.

Rose
One of the three sisters of transvestites Tamayura Clan. Pink goes with her head shaved. Her real name is Takeshi.

Lavender
One of the three sisters of transvestites Tamayura Clan. Will lime green with a shaved head. She is thin and has painted eyes. Her real name is Tsuyoshi.

Lemon
One of the three sisters of transvestites Tamayura Clan. She goes from yellow and with a shaved head. Is thin. Her real name is Kiyoshi.

Satake 
He is the son of the chief of Clan Cataplines. He's champion in martial arts. He loves children. In the end, is passed to the good with Tamayura clans. Its major peculiarity is its enormous musculature.

Yone Higashimatsuyama
A policeman from Chiba. She only hits a shot in the film and is very useless. The origin of the surname is in Higashimatsuyama, Saitama Prefecture, her guns are Beretta M92 FS and M84

Tamao Nakamura
Chief of Clan Cataplines. Wears a kimono, owner of hostess club, has Kyoto accent.

Jack
Demon who had dark power. But his dark power expired on 31 December 1996.

Yoshito Usui
Cameo appearance.

Staff 
The names of the staff are listed below:
Original: Yoshito Usui
Director: Keiichi Hara
Screenplay: Keiichi Hara
Storyboard: Keiichi Hara
Character design: Katsunori Hara
Animation director: Katsunori Hara, Noriyuki Tsutsumi
Cinematography: Toshiyuki Umeda
Music: Toshiyuki Arakawa, Shinji Miyazaki
Sound adjustment: Nobuhiro Shibata
Edit: Hajime Okayasu
Producer: Hitoshi Mogi, Kenji Ōta and Takashi Horiuchi
Production companies: Shin-Ei Animation, TV Asahi and ADK

Release
It was released on 19 April 1997 in Japan. It was released in India as Shinchan in Dark Tama Tama Thrilling Chase and aired on Hungama TV. It was released as Crayon Shinchan The Movie: The Dark Ball Chase with English subtitles on VCD by PMP Entertainment.

See also 

 List of Crayon Shin-chan films

References

External links
 

1997 anime films
Pursuit of the Balls of Darkness
Films directed by Keiichi Hara
Films set in Chiba Prefecture
Films set in Tokyo
Films scored by Shinji Miyazaki